is a Japanese fashion model, actress, and tarento. She was represented with GMB Production.

Filmography

Variety programmes that appeared in the past

Internet dramas

TV dramas

Stage

TV anime

Films

Bibliography

Magazine serialisations

Mook

References

External links
Nihon Blog Mura - Rin-san Profile 
Rin Honoka on Twitter – Wayback Machine (archived on 9 August 2016) 

Japanese television personalities
Japanese female models
Japanese voice actresses
1996 births
Living people
Actresses from Kanagawa Prefecture